This is a list of Malaysian artists known for the creation of artworks that are primarily visual or graphic in nature, including media such as drawing, illustration, sculpture, painting, photography and printmaking. This list excludes musical artists.

The artists are arranged in alphabetical order by their surname, date of birth and death and profession.

List of artists
 A.Kasim Abas (born 1948) – painter
 Ahmad Fuad Osman (born 1969) – painter
 Ahmad Zakii Anwar (born 1955) – painter
 Andie Tong (Born 1979) – comic book artist
 Billy Tan (Born 1970) – comic book artist
 C. N. Liew (1975) – calligrapher, painter
 Chang Fee Ming (born 1959) – painter
 Cheah Thien Soong (born 1942) – contemporary ink-painting artist
 Chuah Thean Teng (1914-2008) – painter 
 Fahmi Reza (born 1977) – Political graphic designer, street artist and documentary film maker.
 Germaine Koh (born 1967) – conceptual artist
 Ibrahim Hussein (1939-2009) – printing, collage
 Khalil Ibrahim (1934-2018) – studio artist
 Kopi Soh – digital artist and illustrator
 Lat (born 1951) – cartoonist
 Leon Lim – artist, designer, photographer
 Mior Shariman Hassan aka Mishar –  cartoonist
 Mohammad Nor Khalid (born 1951) – cartoonist
 Mohamed Zain Idris (1939–2000) – painter
 Muid Latif (1979-2020) – digital artist
 Patric Rozario (born 1964) – painter
 Redza Piyadasa (1939-2007) – painter, art historian
 Rejab bin Had aka Rejabhad (1939 – 2002) – cartoonist
 Shing Yin Khor – cartoonist
 Sonny Liew (born 1974) – comic book artist
 Syed Thajudeen (born 1943) – painter
 Tang Tuck Kan (1934-2012) – painter
 Yong Mun Sen (1896–1962) – painter
 Yeoh Kean Thai (born 1966) – fine artist
 Yusof Ghani (born 1950) – painter, sculptor, professor
 Yong Mun Sen (1896-1962) – painter
 Wong Xiang Yi (born 1987) – visual artist
 Zulkiflee Anwar Haque aka Zunar (born 1962) – political cartoonist

See also
List of Malaysians

References

 
artists
Malaysia